Atico Airport  is an airport serving the Pacific coast Atico District in the Arequipa Region of Peru.

See also

Transport in Peru
List of airports in Peru

References

External links
OpenStreetMap - Atico
OurAirports - Atico
SkyVector - Atico

Airports in Peru
Buildings and structures in Arequipa Region